Hans Biallas (14 October 1918 – 20 August 2009) was a German international footballer. Mostly he played right-wing. At TuS Duisburg 48/99 Willy Busch, Walter Günther, Friedel Holz and Toni Turek, the 1954 world champion, were among his teammates.

References

1918 births
2009 deaths
Association football forwards
German footballers
Germany international footballers